Thomas Bowman Stephenson ( 22 December 1839 – 6 July 1912) was a  Methodist minister.

He founded what was to become the National Children's Home in 1869. He later founded the Wesleyan Deaconesses in 1890. In 1891 he was elected President of the Methodist Conference. He was a member of the London School Board. From 1902 to 1907 he was warden of the Methodist Deaconess Training College at Ilkley, West Yorkshire.

He retired in 1907 and died in London on 6 July 1912. He is buried in City of London Cemetery.

References

External links

 Thomas Bowman Stephenson and the National Children's Home

1839 births
1912 deaths
Wesleyan Methodists
English Methodists
19th-century Methodists
Members of the London School Board
Presidents of the Methodist Conference